The Merry Men are a group of legendary outlaws associated with Robin Hood.

Merry Men may also refer to:

Merry Men: The Real Yoruba Demons, a 2018 action comedy film
"The Merry Men" (short story), an 1882 short story by Robert Louis Stevenson
The Merry Men and Other Tales and Fables, an 1887 collection by Stevenson
The Merrymen, a Barbadian calypso band